Merrillville Community School Corporation is a school district headquartered in Merrillville, Indiana, United States.

The district serves Ross Township which includes the entire town of Merrillville, the city of Crown Point north of 101st Ave, and the city of Hobart, south of 61st Ave.

Merrillville Schools

Secondary schools
 Merrillville High School
Clifford Pierce Middle School (Merrillville)

Primary schools
 5-6
 Merrillville Intermediate School (Merrillville)
 K-4
 Henry P. Fieler Elementary School (Merrillville)
 Homer Iddings Elementary School (Merrillville)
 Edgar L. Miller Elementary School (Merrillville)
 Jonas E. Salk Elementary School (Merrillville)
 John Wood Elementary School (Hobart)

Other
 Adult and Community Education  (Merrillville)

External links
 Merrillville Community School District

Education in Lake County, Indiana
School districts in Indiana
Merrillville, Indiana